Wermsdorf Forest is a forested area of 13,000 hectares, some of which is a natural park, in the state of Saxony, Germany. It is located near the towns Oschatz, Collm, Wermsdorf, Sachsendorf, Dornreichenbach and Luppa and bisected by Bundesstraße 6.

Forests and woodlands of Saxony
Forest